Dr Harekrushna Mallick is an Indian politician from Odisha. Son of Prankrushna and Pranalata Mallick. He was a Member of Parliament, representing Odisha in the Rajya Sabha the upper house of India's Parliament as a member of the Janata Party.

He is siblings are Gopinath, Upendranath, Dr Paramananda & geophysicist Kumarendra Mallick. His grandson Abhishek Mahananda is an Indian National Congress politician from Odisha. A contemporary of Bhairab Chandra Mahanti, Surendra Mohanty & Lakshmana Mahapatro in the Rajya Sabha, Dr Harekrushna has during his tenure participated in over 500 hundred debates on wide range of subjects from sourcing of nuclear fuels, refugee settlement, climate, arts & cinema.

References

Rajya Sabha members from Odisha
Janata Party politicians
1931 births
Possibly living people